Tarros may refer to:

 Tarros (Crete), a town of ancient Crete
 Tarrós, a village in Hungary
 El Tarròs, or Tarrós, a village in Catalonia